Mohammad Tomaliah (1957–2008), a Jordanian writer and journalist, was born in Karak, south of Jordan in 1957. He is considered one of Jordan’s leading satirical writers, who achieved a local and Arab fame. He started his career at Ad-Dustor daily in 1983. He also wrote for other dailies and was a member of the Jordanian Writers Association and of the Arab Writers Association.

Tomaliah is the first Jordanian writer to write satirical articles and stories. He created a unique literary genre where he combined literary and journalistic style in writing that is free of flowery language and cliches.

Early life 

Mohammad Abdullah Mustafa Tomaliah was born in Abu Tarraba village in the governorate of  Karak, south of Jordan. He was born to family who was originally from Innaba village in the  Palestinian city of Al-Ramla. Since childhood, Tomalaih was enchanted by world literature,  especially the Russian; he would memorize entire excerpts from Russian novels and reincarnated  the characters in these novels.

Education 
He earned a BA in Arabic literature from the University of Jordan in 1985.

Works
 Round of Arak  "Jawlat Arak"( short stories), 1980
 The disappointment, "Al Khaibah", 1981
 Remarks on a basic issue, "Mulahazat ala Qadiah Asassiah" 1981
 The scoundrel enthusiasts,"Al Moutahmisoun Al Awaghad", 1986
 Happens to me among all people,"Yahduth Le doun Sa'r Al Nas" articles accompanied with selected cartoons drawn by Emad Hajjaj cartoons, 2004
 To her as a matter of course, "Ilayhā bi-ṭabī’at al-ḥāl- nuṣūṣ khādishah lil-ḥiyād al-‘āmm", 2007

Death 
Tomaliah died in 2008 after suffering for four years from cancer. He is celebrated by Mohammad Tomaliah Award for Short Stories.

References 

1957 births
2008 deaths
Jordanian writers
People from Karak Governorate
University of Jordan alumni
Date of birth missing
Date of death missing